Fatima Boubekdi is a Moroccan filmmaker.

Biography 
After a brief theatrical training in Casablanca, Boubekdi discovered a penchant for directing. She worked alongside Farida Bourquia in 1995 as an assistant director. A year later, she wrote screenplays with filmmakers Mohamed Ismaïl, Hassan Benjelloun and Abdelmajid R'chich. In 1999, she directed her first television film, The Door of Hope. In 2006, she won three prizes at the second edition of the National Amazigh Film Festival for Hammou Ounamir (Grand Prize, Best Directing) and Imouran (Best Screenplay). In 2021, Boubekdi released her first feature film, Annatto. The filmmaker is very passionate about Amazigh culture, the primary language in many of her work being Berber, as well as folklore and Moroccan history, both recurrent themes in her films.

Filmography 

 Kabran Hmad (2005)
 Hammou Ounamir (2006)
 Imouran (2006)
 The Door of Hope (2006)
 Annatto (2021)

References 

Moroccan film directors

Moroccan women film directors

Living people

Year of birth missing (living people)